Melzerella is a genus of beetles in the family Cerambycidae, containing the following species:

 Melzerella costalimai Seabra, 1961
 Melzerella huedepohli Monné, 1979
 Melzerella lutzi Costa Lima, 1931
 Melzerella monnei Wappes & Lingafelter, 2011

References

Aerenicini